Ana Maria Pessoa Pereira da Silva Pinto (born January 5, 1956) is an East Timorese politician, who is currently serving as a prosecutor general of East Timor (since 27 March 2009) and former Minister for State and Internal Administration during the Alkatiri-lead Fretilin government from 2002 - 2007. She is a member of the Fretilin Central Committee. During the United Nations Transitional Administration in East Timor (UNTAET) from 1999 to 2002, Pessoa was the Cabinet Member for the Interior before being appointed as the Justice Minister in the East Timor Transitional Administration (ETTA).

Personal life
More commonly known as Ana Pessoa, she was elected to the National Parliament in the 2007 legislative elections.

Her family originates from the western town of Maliana. A lawyer by training, she held a judicial position in Mozambique during the years of exile.

She is the former wife of José Ramos-Horta, the current president. They have a son, Loro.

References

1956 births
Living people
Members of the National Parliament (East Timor)
People from Bobonaro District
Fretilin politicians
20th-century women politicians
21st-century women politicians
Government ministers of East Timor
Women government ministers of East Timor
Female justice ministers